Olav Orheim (born 22 February 1942) is a Norwegian glaciologist. He served as director of the Norwegian Polar Institute from 1993 to 2005. He was appointed associate professor in glaciology at the University of Bergen in 1989. Orheim was a central participant in the establishment of the research station Troll in Queen Maud Land in Antarctica. Orheim has probably landed atop more icebergs than anyone in the world and was once stranded overnight on one with David Attenborough, the English broadcaster and voice of the nature series "Planet Earth".

References

1942 births
Living people
Scientists from Bergen
Norwegian glaciologists
Ohio State University alumni
Academic staff of the University of Bergen
Antarctic scientists
20th-century Norwegian scientists
21st-century Norwegian scientists
20th-century Norwegian educators
21st-century Norwegian educators